Agonidium obscurum is a species of ground beetle in the subfamily Platyninae. It was described by Maximilien Chaudoir in 1878.

References

obscurum
Beetles described in 1878